Jimmy Savo (1895 – September 5, 1960) was an American Vaudeville, Broadway, nightclub, film and television performer, comedian, juggler, and mime artist.

Life

Born in New York City as James Vincent Savo on July 31, 1895, Savo began his career as a juggler in amateur contests and went on to the burlesque circuit and then Broadway. In 1938, he originated the role of "Dromio of Syracuse" in The Boys from Syracuse.

Savo also starred in "Once In A Blue Moon," (1935) written by Ben Hecht and Charles Macarthur. The film was not a success, costing Paramount pictures $350,000.

In 1942 Isidore Herk and the Shubert brothers co-produced a Broadway show called Wine, Women and Song, starring Jimmy Savo and Margie Hart.
The show was advertised as a combination of vaudeville, burlesque and Broadway revue, and ran for seven weeks.
The revue included striptease, which shocked some of the audiences.
Wine, Women and Song was closed by court order in December 1942.

Savo was the author of two books: Little World, Hello! (1947) and I Bow to the Stones; Memories of a New York Childhood (1963).

He died in Terni, Italy in 1960.

References

Further reading
"Jimmy Savo Dead; Comedian was 64" The New York Times September 7, 1960
"Jimmy Savo (New York 31 luglio 1892 - Guardea 3 settembre 1960); sposato con Frances Victoria Browder, divorziato nel 1935, figli: Jimmy Vincent Savo Junior, sposato in seconde nozze con Farina Lina, Italia, Guardea (Terni), senza figli.
"Jimmy Savo; di Famiglia Lucana originaria di Stigliano (Matera) al "secolo" Vincenzo Rocco Sava, abitò con Farina Lina a Guardea (Terni) Italia nel Castello del Poggio e ad Amelia (Terni) Italia in Via Marcheggiani n. 26. Oggi abitazione "Della Rosa" Amelia (Terni). Referenze, fotografie e note in: www.grupporicercafotografica.it/jimmysavo.htm.
Cullen, Frank, Florence Hackman, and Donald McNeilly. Vaudeville, Old & New: An Encyclopedia of Variety Performers in America. New York: Routledge, 2007. Pg. 993
''Schmucks with Underwoods," Max Wilk, (C) 2004 Applause Theatre and Cinema books

External links

Jimmy Savo at American Museum of Vaudeville.com
Jimmy Savo http://www.grupporicercafotografica.it/jimmysavo.htm
Jimmy Savo http://www.jimmysavo.it
Jimmy Savo http://jimmysavo.altervista.org

Vaudeville performers
American mimes
American male film actors
American male silent film actors
American male comedians
American male musical theatre actors
1895 births
1960 deaths
Jugglers
20th-century American male actors
20th-century American comedians
20th-century American singers
20th-century American male singers